The Valea Satului is a left tributary of the river Crișul Alb in Romania. It flows into the Crișul Alb near Buceș.

References

Rivers of Romania
Rivers of Hunedoara County